Artur Gieraga (born 4 May 1988) is a Polish professional footballer who plays as a defender for RKS Radomsko.

External links 
 

Polish footballers
1988 births
Living people
Association football defenders
ŁKS Łódź players
Ruch Chorzów players
GKS Tychy players
Motor Lublin players
Kotwica Kołobrzeg footballers
RKS Radomsko players
Ekstraklasa players
I liga players
III liga players
IV liga players